Never Seen the Light of Day is the fourth studio album by Swedish band Mando Diao. The album was produced by Björn Olsson and engineered by Patrik Heikinpieti. It was recorded in 2007 while the band were on an exhaustive tour of the world. Frontman Björn Dixgård stated in a recent interview that the band was dissatisfied with their management and tired of the tediousness of the studios so they recorded the album independently in a small studio with producer Björn Olsson. The album was titled 'Never Seen The Light Of Day' because the band believed that the album might not be released, and thus would not see the light of day.

The album was preceded by a single, If I Don't Live Today, I Might Be Here Tomorrow, all around the world on 24 September 2007. The songs are said to be calmer and more sensitive than the band's usual style. A limited edition of the album was released (on the same day as the regular edition) in a special digipak.

The cover for the album (and the accompanying single) bears a strong resemblance to the covers used by Morrissey and The Smiths for many of their releases.

Track listing
 "If I Don't Live Today, Then I Might Be Here Tomorrow" – 2:00
 "Never Seen the Light of Day" – 4:12
 "Gold" – 3:54
 "I Don't Care What the People Say" – 1:51
 "Mexican Hardcore" – 4:37
 "Macadam Cowboy" – 1:42
 "Train On Fire" – 2:52
 "Not A Perfect Day" – 2:54
 "Misty Mountains" – 2:24
 "One Blood" – 6:42
 "Dalarna" – 7:54

Personnel
Mando Diao
Björn Dixgard – vocals, guitars
Gustaf Noren – vocals, guitars
Samuel Giers – drums, percussion
Mats Björke – keyboards
C-J – bass
Additional musicians
Johan Andersson
Fru Palm
Nadja Jahlert
Lina Molander
Karin Hagström
Olga Lantz
Elin Sydhagen
Calle Noren
Fedrik Wennerlund
Björn Olsson
Hans Asteberg
Pontus Ottestig
Mikael Fahleryd
Stefan Bellnas
Livet Nord
Erik Drougge
Brita Linmark
Jonas Franke-Blom

Recording personnel
Patrik Heikinpieti – Recording at Rekord Studios and at Cosmos Studios, Stockholm
Hans Asteberg – Mixing, Recording at Sehr Schön, Orust
Björn Olsson – String arrangements, Engineering, Mixing, Recording at Sehr Schön, Orust
Henryk Lipp – Engineering
Dragan Tanaskovic – Mastering at Bohus Mastering, Kungalv
Gustaf Girnstedt – String arrangements

Artwork
Fredrik Wennerlund – Artwork and collages
Pernilla Wahlin Noren – Collage drawings
Matt Wignall – Band photo

Mando Diao albums
2007 albums